Leroy Jackman (born 19 November 1931) is a Guyanese cricketer. He played in two first-class matches for British Guiana in 1951/52.

See also
 List of Guyanese representative cricketers

References

External links
 

1931 births
Living people
Guyanese cricketers
Guyana cricketers